The Lyme Bay kayaking disaster was a 1993 incident that led to the death of four teenagers on a sea kayaking trip in the Lyme Bay area on the south coast of England. The incident led to legislation to regulate adventure activities centres working with young people in the United Kingdom.

Incident

On 22 March 1993, at 10.15 am, a group of eight schoolchildren, aged 16 – 17yrs, and their teacher from Southway Community College, Plymouth were accompanied by two instructors from St Albans Outdoor Centre on a kayak trip across Lyme Bay, in red Mirage Scout Kayaks. It was a sunny Sunday morning when the group set out. The party consisted of eight teenagers and two trainee instructors; a young man and a young woman. The trip should have taken about 2 hours.  The instructors were later to be discovered to have had very minimal training  and had only recently started in the sport themselves. Although the party intended to cross an open stretch of tidal water they had not informed the coastguard. Joe Stoddart, the adventure centre manager, became worried about the group and the time they were taking, but did not inform the authorities about the missing party. Instead, he waited two hours, while trying to conduct a search from the cliff tops using his car. Eventually he gave this up and went out in his boat to try to find the group, all the while failing to inform the authorities.

He radioed the Weymouth coastguard who scrambled a Sea King helicopter, from Portland after they  finally received information that a party was missing. Initially, they dismissed this information and so there was a further 2 hour delay to the rescue operation starting. At 4:11 pm the Lyme Regis Lifeboat launched. The first rescues of the group's teacher and their young male instructor was made at 5:38 pm. During the period of 5.43pm to 6.40 pm, helicopters picked up the rest of the surviving students and the female instructor. Before the lifeboats and helicopters were scrambled, the coastguard phoned around to see if he could find out if anyone was missing a kayak. He pointed out that if the boat had had some identifying features such as a name, adventure centre name, phone number on it, then the whole process would have been easier. So initially the response was to send out lookouts to prominent cliff tops to see if anything or anyone could be spotted. If they had been kept informed of the activities, they would have acted differently and very much more quickly.

As a result of a series of errors and circumstances, four of the teenagers drowned. The party had run into difficulties straight away as one kayak became swamped. The group was swept out to sea, where all their kayaks were quickly swamped.  Simon Dunne helped to keep the spirits of the group up by singing songs and being encouraging, while they tried to survive by huddling round the one remaining upright boat.

This area of coast is known for a strong funnelling off-shore wind, particularly at the time of year of the trip. Stoddart had trained the two instructors just prior to them taking their first group of young people, this one. They had been given rudimentary instruction in an outdoor pool. The two instructors had passed their one star performance test just prior to taking on this post (one star performance shows a person who holds it has some very basic knowledge about how to turn a craft, make it go forwards and backwards and can safely exit it if it turns the wrong way up). Mirage (this old catalogue shows a mirage kayak from the era on page 17 https://www.perceptionkayaks.com/us/sites/default/files/perc%201993-94a_3.pdf also see https://www.worthpoint.com/worthopedia/perception-mirage-kayak-286780216) boats are not suitable craft for doing this type of crossing and the members of the party were so inexperienced as to not be able to use spray decks.  A spray deck is also known as a spray skirt, fitting round the paddler, rising above the waist line and fitting tightly around the opening known as a cockpit.  The party were equipped with wetsuits, inflatable life vests and a helmet along with their craft, a mirage kayak and their paddle.  Buoyancy aids are more appropriate for kayaking as heads can get banged on  exit and cold water causes disorientation, known as cold water shock.  Cold water shock will make it difficult for the boater to inflate the vest by blowing into it.  Self inflating vests are now available but these also have some downsides for kayaking.  More information on personal floatation devices can be found at https://www.britishcanoeing.org.uk/news/2021/sup-safety-personal-floatation-device-and-buoyancy-aid-guidance.  They were not wearing wet boots to protect their feet from the cold and the absence of a PFD in the form of a jacket, deprived them of another layer of insulation.  The paddlers had no waterproof tops.  Canoe/Kayak cags provide a waterproof and windproof layer, which prevents the loss of heat due to the wind chill and also protects the loss of water by evaporation from the wetsuit.  This enables to wetsuit to best do its job of providing a layer of warm, wet water next to the skin.

The two 'instructors' had spray decks (Spray deck#:~:text=A spraydeck is made of,the torso of each passenger.). Within 20 minutes of the trip starting all but one of the kayaks had got into difficulties. The kayaks which became swamped did so due to a wave hitting them and the water getting in via the cockpit. As these were closed deck kayaks, the water was now trapped inside the boat, making it unstable. As the instructors were not trained in deep water rescues nor in putting students back into boats, once the first capsize happened they were at a loss over what to do. The remaining boats were rafted up. the student with the swamped boat was put back in but the boat was not emptied, other than by trying to scoop the water out.  Rafting is when the kayakers line up side to side, this enables them to achieve a more stable condition, with each kayaker helping the boats on either side to remain upright, even if being knocked off balance by small waves.  It is wise to note that; this is not recommended in a big swell nor in surf.  It is also not recommended in windy conditions as the line of bodies forms a sail.

The Charmouth Funnel wind began to push the raft out to sea as the line of bodies acted like a sail. As the group got further out the waves increased in height and caused further boats to become swamped. Early boats, such as these, did not come fitted with air bags to maintain their buoyancy and to stop them filling with water. Some of them did not even benefit from closed cell foam blocks. Closed cell foam is foam which holds air, with the plastic being blown in such a way that the bubbles are complete and cannot fill with water when submerged. Once the boats filled with water they began to sink. The students were left in the water with only their personal floatation devices and inadequate personal clothing for the prevailing conditions and the sea temperature.  Due to the Mirage boat being a slightly more modern design, it had two big blocks of foam down its length.  These kept one of the swamped boats afloat enough to be swept towards a fishing vessel, which raised the alarm with the coast guard.  The coast guard dismissed it as a boat left unattended on the foreshore and blown out to sea as there had been no reports of boats or paddlers missing from anyone ashore.

As they capsized, the female instructor advised the sixth formers to not inflate their BVs as she felt that this would discourage them.  The vests became waterlogged due to their stay in the water and, later as they began to really need them, they were unable to inflate them.  https://www.tes.com/magazine/archive/fatal-catalogue-simple-errors

The centre handyman had been due to pick up the kayakers at the end of their trip.  He returned to the centre to alert the manager at 12.25pm.  The manager waited until 3.07 pm to call the coast guard after he had driven his Land drover along the cliff, looking for the party from shore.  When he phoned the coast guard, he stated that the group were well equipped and had flares and that they were well qualified.  This group did not have flares and did not have a tow line, if they had had a tow line, it is unlikely that they would have known what to do with it as they were not well qualified (https://www.tes.com/magazine/archive/fatal-catalogue-simple-errors).   The last kayak sank at about 3pm.

The delayed response, due to the lack of information provided by the centre manager, the inadequate information on the boats and the delay by the manager in reporting his lost group may all have contributed to 3 students dying from hypothermia before rescuers managed to get them into hospital, and another dying later.

A local coach, who was qualified to run such a trip, is quoted as saying that he would not have run the trip unless all the participants had their three star in personal performance, let alone the instructors. British Canoeing (BCU as it was then) https://www.britishcanoeingawarding.org.uk/leadership-moderate-water/ stated that the minimum leadership skills for a leader on that trip would be Senior Sea Kayak Instructor, which is a qualification which takes a minimum of one year to achieve once the Kayaker has achieved a 3 star in personal performance, which could take another two years on top.

Since the event there has been a tribute to the lost souls in the Plymouth Herald.  https://www.plymouthherald.co.uk/news/plymouth-news/lyme-bay-tragedy-parents-describe-1364914 and the Dorset Echo https://www.dorsetecho.co.uk/news/features/lookingback/19274261.remembering-lyme-bay-canoe-tragedy/.

As a disaster much should be learned from this and much learning has been lost as some of the original papers cannot be found on line, however this program should give some insights https://hstalks.com/t/4264/tragedy-in-lyme-bay-a-whistleblowing-cautionary-ta/

The TES reported on this at the time and an article on this can be found here https://www.tes.com/magazine/archive/fatal-catalogue-simple-errors

Inquest
The subsequent investigation resulted in the prosecution of the parent company and the centre manager. The owner of the activity centre was convicted of gross negligence manslaughter over the deaths. This was the only successful conviction involving a corporation for this offence in the UK. The owner was jailed for four years, but his sentence was cut to two years on appeal.

During the inquest, it was suggested that the tragedy was an accident waiting to happen. (https://www.heraldscotland.com/news/12664382.centre-received-warnings-months-before-teenagers-died-court-told-canoe-tragedy-was-waiting-to-happen/)

Legacy
This incident accelerated governmental discussions to end self-regulation of outdoor education centres. The Activity Centres (Young Persons’ Safety) Act 1995, introduced by Labour MP David Jamieson was passed through Parliament in January 1995 and an independent licensing authority, the Adventure Activities Licensing Authority (AALA) was formed, funded by the Department of Education and Employment (DFE) and under the guidance of the Health and Safety Executive.

A number of legislations were made about running school trips subsequently to this and a number of law changes affected the provision of activities at adventure holiday centres in the UK after this.  Where they had once been very affordable, due to the need to run with qualified staff, the prices had to go up accordingly.  A newspaper article about the changes in legislation can be found here - https://www.theguardian.com/uk/2000/aug/08/education.educationnews and the Parliament early day motions can be found here https://edm.parliament.uk/early-day-motion/6305/lyme-bay-canoeing-accident

https://www.bridportnews.co.uk/news/9326334.lyme-bay-canoe-tragedy-will-be-repeated-if-law-changes-warn-campaigners/ On 26 October 2012, Lord Young of Graffham called for the legislation to be reduced to guidance and for the Adventure Activities Licencing Authority (which was set up as a result of this incident) to be scrapped.  People warned that this is happened then further deaths and tragedies such as this could occur.  The AALA remains in existence on this date 21/04/2022 https://www.hse.gov.uk/aala/

See also
Cairngorm Plateau disaster

References

Maritime incidents in the United Kingdom
Maritime incidents in 1993
1993 disasters in the United Kingdom
1993 in England
1990s in Devon
Canoeing in the United Kingdom
History of Devon
History of Dorset
Manslaughter trials
Canoeing deaths
Canoeing in England
March 1993 events in the United Kingdom